Richard Dormer (born 11 November 1969) is an actor, playwright and screenwriter from Northern Ireland. He is best known for his roles as Beric Dondarrion in the HBO television series Game of Thrones and Dan Anderssen in Sky Atlantic's Fortitude.

Early life
Dormer was born in Portadown, Northern Ireland. He studied at the RADA school of acting in London. After living and working in London, he returned to Northern Ireland. He lives in Belfast and is married to director Rachel O'Riordan.

Career
Dormer gained recognition following his performance as Northern Irish snooker star Alex Higgins in Hurricane in 2003, which he wrote and starred in. Dormer won The Stage award for Best Actor in 2003. 

In 2004, Dormer won the Irish Times Best Actor Award for his performance in Frank McGuinness's Observe the Sons of Ulster Marching Towards the Somme and in 2005 completed a season with Sir Peter Hall at the Theatre Royal and starred in Bath as Antonio in William Shakespeare's Measure for Measure, Jean in August Strindberg's Miss Julie and in a production of Samuel Beckett's Waiting for Godot.

Dormer has since written a number of plays including The Half and Gentleman's Tea Drinking Society which were produced through Belfast's Ransom theatre company. In 2012, Dormer was commissioned by the Abbey Theatre to write a play. Set in Brooklyn in the summer of 1969, Dormer's Drum Belly gives an insight into the dark edgy underworld of New York's Irish gangsters and opened April 2013 to mainly positive reviews and was published by Bloomsbury Publishing 

Dormer has provided the voices for over twenty BBC Radio 4 plays, documentaries and advertising campaigns. In 2020, he played the Director of the Civil Contingencies Secretariat in the Sky drama series, COBRA, starring Robert Carlyle as the British Prime Minister.

Film
Following a run of film castings playing secondary characters, he was cast as the lead in the 2012 Good Vibrations which tells the story of Northern Ireland personality and punk rock visionary Terri Hooley. The film premièred at the 2012 Cannes Film Festival, was awarded Best Film at the Galway film awards, best screenplay, Dinard and nominated for the Outstanding Debut award at the 2014 British Academy of Film and Television Arts Awards. The film was well received by critics gaining consistent reviews, most of which highlighted Dormer's performance as a strength. Dormer's portrayal of Terri Hooley saw him nominated in the Best Actor award in the 2013 Irish Film and Television Awards. He has since played roles in Yann Demange's critically acclaimed film '71 alongside Jack O'Connell. In 2019, Dormer portrayed Curtis Welch, town physician of Nome, Alaska, in the Disney film Togo.

Television
Dormer has become a well known television actor, more recently playing key roles in the Cinemax drama series Hunted and BBC One's Hidden. 2012 also saw Dormer taking over the role of Lord Beric Dondarrion, known as the "Lightning Lord", the leader of the "Brotherhood Without Banners", for the third season of the HBO series Game of Thrones. In 2016, Dormer reprised his role as Dondarrion in the sixth season of the series and returned for the seventh season, airing in 2017 as well as the eighth and final season, airing in 2019.

Dormer is the voice of the Dad on the children's animated series Lily's Driftwood Bay. The series aired in May on Nick Jr. in the UK and on Sprout in the US. It also airs on RTÉ in Ireland, ABC Australia, KiKa in Germany, MTV in Finland, NRK in Norway, SVT in Sweden, and HOP! in Israel. Broadcasters in Australia and the US are keeping the original voices to the series.

In 2014, Dormer began filming on Sky Atlantic's Fortitude. Described as "their most ambitious project to date", he takes the role of Sheriff Dan Anderssen and stars alongside Stanley Tucci, Michael Gambon, Christopher Eccleston and The Killing'''s Sofie Gråbøl. Fortitude aired on 29 January 2015. The series is set in the fictional Arctic Norwegian settlement of Fortitude. On 9 April 2015, Sky Atlantic recommissioned the show for a second series consisting of 10 episodes.

Also in 2015, Dormer starred in the BBC drama We're Doomed! The Dad's Army Story as TV producer David Croft. The comedy drama retells the creation of the popular BBC sitcom Dad's Army as well as the relationship between Croft and Jimmy Perry who became successful TV comedy writers.

In 2020, Dormer appeared in the lead role of Captain Sam Vimes of the Ankh-Morpork City Watch in the BBC series The Watch, based on the Discworld novels by Terry Pratchett. He also has played Fraser Walker, Director of the Civil Contingencies Secretariat, in two series of COBRA''.

Filmography

Film

Television

References

External links
 

1969 births
Male film actors from Northern Ireland
Living people
Male musical theatre actors from Northern Ireland
Male stage actors from Northern Ireland
People from Portadown
21st-century male actors from Northern Ireland
20th-century male actors from Northern Ireland
Alumni of RADA